The 2012–13 Slovenian PrvaLiga was the 22nd edition of the Slovenian PrvaLiga since its establishment in 1991. Also known by the abbreviation 1. SNL, PrvaLiga was contested by the top ten clubs in Slovenia, for the title of national champions. The fixture schedule was released on 26 June 2012. The season began on 14 July 2012 and ended on 26 May 2013.

Maribor were the defending champions, having won their 10th league title the previous season. The season featured nine teams from the 2011–12 Slovenian PrvaLiga and one team from the 2011–12 Slovenian Second League, Aluminij, who was promoted directly as the winners of the second division, replacing Nafta. This was the first season for Aluminij in the top division.

Teams

A total of ten teams contested the league, including nine from the 2011–12 Slovenian PrvaLiga and one promoted from the 2011–12 Slovenian Second League. Aluminij secured direct promotion as champions of the Slovenian Second League. They replaced Nafta Lendava in the top division, who finished at the bottom of the PrvaLiga table, ending their seven-season tenure in the top division. This was the first season for Aluminij in the Slovenian PrvaLiga. Even though Dob won the relegation play-offs against Triglav Kranj, they declined promotion to the top division because of financial reasons; as a result, Triglav was not relegated and remained in the PrvaLiga for the 2012–13 season.

Stadiums and locations

1Seating capacity only. Some stadiums (e.g. Aluminij, Mura 05, Rudar) also have standing areas.

League table

Positions by round

Relegation play-offs
Mura 05, who finished in ninth place in the league, should play against Dob, who finished in second place in the Slovenian Second League. However, Mura 05 did not get the competition licence for the 2013–14 season and was dissolved, while Dob declined promotion, so the third-placed team of the Slovenian Second League, Krka, got promoted.

Results
Every team plays four times against their opponents, twice at home and twice on the road, for a total of 36 matches.

First half of the season

Second half of the season

Season statistics

Top goalscorers
Updated through matches played on 26 May 2013.

Hat-tricks

Attendance

Awards

PrvaLiga Player of the season

Agim Ibraimi

PrvaLiga U23 Player of the season

Boban Jović

SPINS XI

Footnotes
The official figure of 0 attendance on a match between Mura 05 and Koper, during the 34th round, is disputed and presumably wrong. Although the PrvaLiga uses the figure on their official website it can be clearly seen from the official video summary of the match, on the same website, that during the match there were several hundred spectators on the stands. A report from the Slovenian Press Agency uses the figure of 500 spectators for the match.

See also
2012 Slovenian Supercup
2012–13 Slovenian Football Cup
2012–13 Slovenian Second League

References
General

Specific

External links
 
Soccerway profile

Slovenian PrvaLiga seasons
Slovenia
1